Euskadi is a former Spanish cycling team based in Basque Country that existed from 2005 to 2014. It was one of the European teams in UCI Continental Tour.

Orbea's team manager Álvaro González de Galdeano is the older brother of Igor González de Galdeano, the last manager of Euskaltel. The team focused primarily on young riders, of whom the most successful usually made the transfer to Euskaltel–Euskadi.

Sponsorship 
Main sponsor Orbea is a bicycle manufacturer based in Mallabia. Throughout  cycling history, Orbea has sponsored numerous cycling teams.

Major wins
2005
Stage 6 Tour de l'Avenir, Jesús Del Nero
2006
Stage 1 Vuelta a la Comunidad de Madrid, Josu Agirre
Stage 3 Euskal Bizikleta, Aaron Villegas
Stage 7 Circuito Montañés, Vidal Celis
2007
Stage 2 Circuito Montañés, Xabat Otxotorena
Stage 7 Circuito Montañés, Ivan Melero
2008
Stage 1a Vuelta a Navarra, Team Time Trial
2009
Subida al Naranco, Romain Sicard
Stage 3 Tour du Haut Anjou, Jonathan Castroviejo
Prologue Ronde de l'Isard, Jonathan Castroviejo
Stage 2 Ronde de l'Isard, Romain Sicard
2010
2011
Stage 1 GP Costa Azul, Jon Aberasturi
Stage 4 Vuelta a Asturias, Victor Cabedo
Stage 2 Cinturo de l'Emporda, Ricardo García
2013
Stage 2 Ronde de l'Isard, Carlos Barbero
Overall Tour de Gironde, Jon Larrinaga
Stage 2, Jon Larrinaga
Stage 2 Troféu Joaquim Agostinho, Jon Larrinaga
2014
Overall Volta ao Alentejo, Carlos Barbero
Stage 1 Tour de Gironde, Team time trial
Circuito de Getxo, Carlos Barbero

2013 team
As of 23 January 2013.

See also
List of cycling teams in Spain

References

Orbea - Oreka SDA
UCI Continental Teams (Europe)
Cycling teams established in 1932
1932 establishments in Spain
Cycle racing in the Basque Country (autonomous community)